Walter Henry Tullis (born April 12, 1953) is a former wide receiver in the National Football League. He was drafted in the twelfth round of the 1976 NFL Draft by the Washington Redskins and later played two seasons with the Green Bay Packers.

References

People from Americus, Georgia
Green Bay Packers players
New Jersey Generals players
American football wide receivers
Delaware State Hornets football players
1953 births
Living people
Players of American football from Georgia (U.S. state)